Gap creationism (also known as ruin-restoration creationism, restoration creationism, or "the Gap Theory") is a form of old Earth creationism that posits that the six-yom creation period, as described in the Book of Genesis, involved six literal 24-hour days (light being "day" and dark "night" as God specified), but that there was a gap of time between two distinct creations in the first and the second verses of Genesis, which the theory states explains many scientific observations, including the age of the Earth. It differs from day-age creationism, which posits that the 'days' of creation were much longer periods (of thousands or millions of years), and from young Earth creationism, which although it agrees concerning the six literal 24-hour days of creation, does not posit any gap of time.

History 
From 1814, Thomas Chalmers popularized gap creationism; he attributed the concept to the 17th-century Dutch Arminian theologian Simon Episcopius. Chalmers wrote:

Chalmers became a divinity professor at the University of Edinburgh, founder of the Free Church of Scotland, and author of one of the Bridgewater Treatises. Other early proponents of gap creationism included Oxford University geology professor and fellow Bridgewater author William Buckland, Sharon Turner and Edward Hitchcock.

The idea gained widespread attention when a "second creative act" was discussed prominently in the reference notes for Genesis in the influential 1917 Scofield Reference Bible.

In 1954, a few years before the re-emergence of young-Earth flood-geology eclipsed Gap creationism, influential evangelical theologian Bernard Ramm wrote in The Christian View of Science and Scripture:

Ramm's book became influential in the formation of another alternative to gap creationism, that of progressive creationism, which found favour with more conservative members of the American Scientific Affiliation (a fellowship of scientists who are Christians), with the more modernist wing of that fellowship favouring theistic evolution.

Religious proponents of this form of creationism have included Oral Roberts (1918-2009), Cyrus I. Scofield, Harry Rimmer, Jimmy Swaggart (1935-  ),  Perry Stone, G. H. Pember, L. Allen Higley, Arthur Pink, Peter Ruckman, Finis Jennings Dake (1902-1987), Chuck Missler, E. W. Bullinger (1837-1913), Charles Welch,  Victor Paul Wierwille, Donald Grey Barnhouse, Herbert W. Armstrong (1892-1986), Garner Ted Armstrong (1930-2003), Michael Pearl and Clarence Larkin.

Interpretation of Genesis

Some gap creationists may believe that science has proven beyond reasonable doubt that the Earth is far older than can be accounted for by, for instance, adding up the ages of Biblical patriarchs as James Ussher famously attempted in the 17th century when he developed the Ussher chronology.

For some, the gap theory allows both the Genesis creation account and geological science to be inerrant in matters of scientific fact. By positing such an event, various observations in a wide range of fields, including the age of the Earth, the age of the universe, dinosaurs, fossils, ice cores, ice ages, and geological formations are allowed by adherents to have occurred as outlined by science without contradicting their literal belief in Genesis.

Biblical support 
Because there is no specific information given in Genesis concerning the proposed gap of time, other scriptures are used to support and explain what may have occurred during this period and to explain the specific linguistic reasoning behind this interpretation of the Hebrew text. A short list of examples is given below:

 The Masoretic Text contains a small mark at the end of Genesis 1:1, referred to as a rebhia, which acts as a "disjunctive accent", indicating that the reader is to pause before proceeding to the next verse. It is one indication, among others, that the waw which introduces verse 2 should be translated "but" rather than "and".
Such a word choice makes the gap interpretation easier to see in modern English.
 God is perfect and everything He does is perfect, so a newly created earth from the hand of God should not have been without form and void and shrouded in darkness. ,  
 The Holy Spirit was "renewing" the face of the earth as he hovered over the face of the waters, noting that the water-covered planet already existed. 
 Angels already existed in a state of grace when God "laid the foundations of the Earth", so there had been at least one creative act of God before the six days of Genesis. 
 Satan and his angels caused the war in Heaven and had fallen from grace "in the beginning" which, since the serpent tempted Adam and Eve, had to have occurred before the Fall of man.

See also
 Answers in Genesis
 Dating creation
 Silurian hypothesis

Notes

References

Further reading
 Sailhammer, John, Genesis Unbound (Multnomah Books, 1996).

Old Earth creationism